Greg Lake (born 1960 as Gregory Alan Whaley) has been a Florida radio personality for nearly 20 years.

Early life and career
He was born in the Northern Virginia suburbs of Washington, D.C. and moved to Florida in the late 1970s to attend Flagler College in St. Augustine, where he met and married his wife, Kathy. 

Moving to South Florida, he launched his radio career at WKGR 98.7 (Ft. Pierce, Florida) where he stayed until the station was sold. He then followed the entire on-air staff to then WAKS-FM 103.7 (Fort Myers, Florida) where they stayed until it too was eventually sold. Once again, the entire on-air staff returned to the east coast of Florida to take over WZZR 92.7 (Port St. Lucie, Florida) where he continued his program "The Dead Zone" until the end of 1994 when he took over the morning drive show. He remained there until the spring of 1996 when he was fired for sagging ratings. Greg then, moved to Daytona Beach and started his own advertising agency (Alternative Advertising). After four years in the advertising business, he was offered, and accepted, the Production Director post at WELE 1380, Ormond Beach.  

After a year, as Production Director he was promoted to the Program Director position. At the height of the controversial 2000 presidential election, Greg launched and hosted his own politically driven, morning call-in talk show called "Radio Free Volusia" which aired Worldwide on the internet and locally on WELE five days a week, until his final show on April 25, 2008. 

During the eight years of daily shows, Greg interviewed hundreds of famous national political figures, captains of industry and celebrities in the entertainment field. Along with his often controversial interview style, Greg was also a source for breaking news stories. Many of those stories were in the wake of the September 11th 2001 terrorist attacks. 

Greg is a political web blogger for voiceoftherepublic.com and radiofreevolusia.com where he continues to voice his often controversial point of view.

In 2011, Greg officially launches another website voxominous.com.

External links
 WELE/Daytona's 'Radio Free Volusia' Gets New Time
 Greg Lake (Gregory Whaley)  Biography
 Radio Free Volusia With Greg Lake ratings
 Radio Free Volusia
 Voice of the Republic
 Voxominous

1960 births
Living people
American bloggers
American advertising executives
Businesspeople from Florida
Radio personalities from Florida
American political writers
American radio directors